All About Loving is a 1964 French comedy film directed by Jean Aurel and starring Anna Karina.

Cast
 Anna Karina as Hélène
 Elsa Martinelli as Mathilde
 Michel Piccoli as Raoul
 Jean Sorel as Antoine
 Philippe Avron as Serge
 Joanna Shimkus as Sophie
 Bernard Garnier as Werther
 Isabelle Lunghini
 Bernard Nicolas as Frédéric
 Katia Christine as Katia Kristine

References

External links
 

1964 films
1964 comedy films
1960s French-language films
French black-and-white films
Films based on works by Stendhal
Films directed by Jean Aurel
1960s French films
French comedy films